Lydia Jane Powell (born 18 April 1996) is a female badminton player from England.

Achievements 
Women's Singles

 BWF International Challenge tournament
 BWF International Series tournament
 BWF Future Series tournament

References

External links 
 
 

1996 births
Living people
English female badminton players